Coventry is a station stop on the Greater Cleveland RTA Green Line in Shaker Heights, Ohio. It is located at the intersection of Coventry Road and Shaker Boulevard (Ohio State Route 87) on the border between Cleveland and Shaker Heights.

History
The station opened on December 17, 1913, with the initiation of rail service on what is now Shaker Boulevard. The rail line was in the nature of a streetcar line, and it ran from the existing tracks on Fairmount Boulevard, south on Coventry Road, and then east along the newly laid-out boulevard, initially an extension of Coventry. At that time, there was no Shaker Boulevard west of Coventry, and Coventry did not extend south beyond Shaker. The line was built by Cleveland Interurban Railroad (CIRR) and operated by the Cleveland Railway until 1930. The railway also operated the streetcar line on Fairmount Boulevard. Trains ran from the terminus at Fontenay Road, down Coventry Road, and then to downtown Cleveland using the Cleveland Railway tracks from Fairmount Boulevard.

In 1920, the line was extended west from Coventry Road along new right-of-way to East 34th Street where the trains resumed traveling on Cleveland Railway tracks to downtown Cleveland. Service on this new line began from Shaker Boulevard on August 16, 1920. The new line significantly reduced travel time to downtown as considerable street running was eliminated. However, at CIRR's request Cleveland Railway continued to operate shuttle service along Coventry Road from Fairmount Boulevard to Shaker Boulevard, and this service was subsidized by CIRR. A station house with a waiting room was constructed at Coventry Road and Shaker Boulevard to serve passengers making the connection. It was constructed by Standard Oil Company of Ohio at a cost of $17,500, and it included two gasoline pumps along westbound Shaker Boulevard. Sohio's construction price was applied against a long-term lease with CIRR.

The Coventry Road shuttle service lasted only until March 12, 1923. When CIRR discontinued the subsidy and the service ended, there were numerous objections, and even a lawsuit by the City of Cleveland Heights. CIRR prevailed and formally petitioned the Ohio Public Utilities Commission to abandon the right-of-way on Coventry Road on June 17, 1925. The need for the station house at Coventry station ended, but the service station there continued for many years. After the station house's use as a service station ended, it was leased to a series of tenants for other uses.

In 1980 and 1981, the Green and Blue Lines were completely renovated with new track, ballast, poles and wiring, and new stations were built along the line. The historic Coventry station house—its days as a gasoline service station long ended—was renovated with the addition of new exterior waiting spaces. The renovated line along Shaker Boulevard opened on October 11, 1980. For many years, Coventry was the sole remaining station to retain its yellow station name sign, once a fixture of all stations on the Shaker and Van Aken lines. However, the sign has since been removed.

Station layout
The station comprises two side platforms west of the intersection. There is a relatively large Tudor-style station house on the westbound platform.

Notable places nearby
Plymouth Church of Shaker Heights

References

 

Green Line (RTA Rapid Transit)
Railway stations in the United States opened in 1913
1913 establishments in Ohio